A harbor (or harbour) is a place where ships may shelter from the weather or are stored. 

Harbo(u)r or The Harbo(u)r may also refer to:

Arts and entertainment
 Harbor (America album), 1977
 Harbor (Marc Douglas Berardo album) or the title song, 2005
 Harbour (film), a 1996 Indian Malayalam film
 Harbour (novel), a 2008 novel by John Ajvide Lindqvist
 Harbour (painting), an 1881 oil painting by Joaquín Sorolla

Companies and organizations
 Harbor Airlines, a defunct American commuter airline
 Harbour Air Seaplanes, a Canadian charter airline
 Harbour Group, a Washington, D.C., advocacy group
 Harbour Productions Unlimited, an American television production company

People 
 David Harbour (born 1975), American actor
 William Harbour (disambiguation), several people

Places and structures
 Harbor, Oregon, US
 Harbor Towers, two residential towers in Boston, Massachusetts, US
 Harbor Transitway, a roadway in Interstate Highway 110 in Los Angeles County, California, US
 Harbour (state assembly constituency), a constituency of Tamil Nadu, India
 Harbour Islets, Tasmania, Australia
 The Harbour (hospital), a mental health hospital in Blackpool, Lancashire, England

Other uses
 Harbour (horse) (1979–1985), a French Thoroughbred racehorse
 Harbour (programming language), an xBase language

See also
 Grand Harbour (disambiguation)
 Harbor station (disambiguation)
 Harbour Bridge (disambiguation)
 Harbour City (disambiguation)
 Harbour Island (disambiguation)
 Harbour View (disambiguation)